River John is an unincorporated community in Pictou County, Nova Scotia, Canada.

It is located near the mouth of the River John on the Northumberland Strait, halfway between Pictou and Tatamagouche near the boundary with Colchester County. It is on Nova Scotia Trunk 6 and the designated tourist route, the Sunrise Trail.

River John was colonized by Europeans during the 18th century and its port and the proximity of plentiful timber led to the development of a small shipbuilding industry.

Today the local economy is based on the seasonal industries of fishing, agriculture, and tourism. The area is a popular summer cottage location for residents of Halifax and other urban areas in the province.  The village supports a few local shops, a library, several churches, a post office and a volunteer fire department. The K-9 school was closed in 2015.

The Nova Scotia folklorist W. Roy MacKenzie (1883–1957) lived in River John, as does novelist Linda Little.

History 
The river was originally called Caijebouguac (lonely river) by the indigenous Mikmaq. ‘River John’ has a name of French origin but the English named the river Deception River, although this name has been lost and is used only by very few elderly residents. The name ‘River John’ came to be as almost all of the original settlers had the name John; John George, John Patriquin, etc. The name River John is a beautiful and euphonious name that isn't as well known as it deserves, because of the hundreds of vessels built and registered in the area and designated from other ports in its early days. Now the village is very modern in business, but the famous river sunsets will always hold a glimpse of the past.

The first official settlers in River John were four men and their families who did not want to pay as tenants in the nearby village of Tatamagouche. At the time the land was part of the Philadelphia grant owned by a company that had no longer use for it, so it was sold off. In 1785 John Frederic Patriquin, John George Patriquin, George Frederic Langill (or Langille) and James Gratto each built their log cabins near each other originally and then more settlers came in each taking their own land.

School 
In 1808, the school was opened under Reverend John Mitchelle who came from Amherst to River John, with Christopher Perrin as the schoolmaster teaching his pupils to read, write, and count in French with classes being held in just local houses. In 1818 the first school was built with James Hogg and Edward Lynch as some of the first teachers that year. Another school had to be built at the cross roads of Main and what is now School Street, but was torn down in 1968. There were also small schools located on the properties of the late Rev. John Mitchelle and the late D. Mackay Ross. Each surrounding rural community had their own one room school house, Mountain Road, Louisville, Marshville, Cape John, Seafoam, Melville, Hodson, Hedgeville, Bigney, Welsford, and Toney River.

The River John Consolidated School was built in 1968 at the top of School Street with a few hundred students attending, with the new addition built in 1985 around when one of the old schools was torn down near it. Until its closure in 2015, the school held students from primary through to nine. Students in senior high had to then travel by bus to West Pictou High School in Lyons Brook, and more recently Northumberland Regional High in Alma.

Newspaper 
The Pioneer community newspaper began publishing in 1877 on every Thursday in River John, with a subscription rate of 50 cents for the year. The Pioneer contained business ads that were prominent during the shipbuilding days, carriage building, local events such as kitchen parties, fancy goods and patient mediation ads since the paper was edited and published by J. D. Gauld who was the owner of the drug store.

With the decline of shipbuilding which resulted in loss of many businesses in the late 1880s, the Pioneer ran its last issue. Here are examples of inserts within the original newspaper: In the February 27th issue, 1879, notes “Mrs Bates, better know here as Miss Anne Swan, the Nova Scotia Giantess, has presented Mr Bates with a child. 30 inches in length, 16 inches across the chest and 22 pounds in weight.”

In July 2014, The Pioneer was resurrected again after near 130 years with monthly publishing's on paper and online. It is now published by the River John Community Action Society as a not-for-profit community-owned paper and contains upcoming events, community news, crossword puzzle, letters to the editor and more. The advertisements in the paper pay for the residences in the B0K1N0 district, but outside of that is a $25 yearly fee. www.riverjohn.ca is The Pioneer website.

Shipbuilding 
River John was a very thriving community in the mid-1800s with as many as four vessels under construction at once with many sailing around the world. The first vessel launched was the Robert MacKay in 1825. The production of larger ships began around 1835, when Alexander McKenzie built the barque (typically a three-mast sailing ship in which the front and mainmast are square rigged and only the mizzen is front and rear) Charles weighing at 519 tons. The first vessel to exceed 1,000 tons was the Mary P. Kitchin in 1874.

River John built Pictou County's largest sailing ships, the Warrior and the Caldera. The Warrior measured 221’ long, 50’5", 24’2" in depth, weighing 1,687.27 tons with two and a quarter decks. The Caldera (River John distillery, Caldera, was named after this ship) was launched a fortnight after her rival. She was longer than the Warrior but with less deck tonnage, 230’ long, breadth 39’ 5", hold depth 24’1", and weighed 1,575 tons. The Caldera was one of the more well-known ships in the province to have made at least one voyage around the world.

The shipyard workmen kept well entertained with music from their own band.  In the area there was a cricket field, a skating rink and a YMCA hall. It is noted in the Forbes’ MS, “with the shipbuilding squires stepping out for church on Sunday mornings or driving their matched bays on Saturday afternoon, River John was able to hold its own with the best of the country.”

The timber for ships was cut by hand and hauled out by horse or oxen to a cleared space near the building site, this was more suitable during the winter while the snow lay deep over the woodlands. The launch site was on the area what is now called “River Road”, the ships faced into the sunset with the heavy planks set down into the water for a gentle slide into the channel in the mouth of the bay. Even today there are traces of the launch site during low tide hidden by the mudflats. With the construction of the railway and improved roads, the need for waterborne transportation dwindled.

Tourism 
Since 1999, River John has hosted the annual Read By the Sea literary festival. Featured guests have included Alexander MacLeod and Margaret Atwood.

References

External links
River John virtual village
Shipyards of River John
Gordon, G. Lawson. River John: Its pastors and people.1911

Communities in Pictou County